This is a complete list of people who have served as speakers of the Idaho House of Representatives to the present.

See also
 List of Idaho state legislatures

Idaho
Speakers